John Ivan Pavelich (1924/1925 – June 1, 1999) was a Canadian athlete who competed in throwing events.

Pavelich, born in Yugoslavia, was a 1949 graduate of the University of British Columbia and a member of the Vancouver Olympic Club. He was a Canadian national champion in javelin and discus. In 1954 he won a silver medal for shot put at the British Empire and Commonwealth Games, which was being hosted by Vancouver. At the 1955 Pan American Games, Pavelich finished in the top six in both discus and shot put. He also competed at the 1959 Pan American Games.

A physical education teacher by profession, Pavelich married university lecturer Joan (Johnson) and they had three children. One of their daughters, also named Joan, was a national champion in shot put.

See also
List of Commonwealth Games medallists in athletics (men)

References

1920s births
1999 deaths
Canadian male shot putters
Canadian male discus throwers
Canadian male javelin throwers
Yugoslav emigrants to Canada
University of British Columbia alumni
Commonwealth Games silver medallists for Canada
Commonwealth Games medallists in athletics
Medallists at the 1954 British Empire and Commonwealth Games
Athletes (track and field) at the 1954 British Empire and Commonwealth Games
Pan American Games track and field athletes for Canada
Athletes (track and field) at the 1955 Pan American Games
Athletes (track and field) at the 1959 Pan American Games